William "Bill" Phillips Webb (18 March 1868 - c. 1931) was a New Zealand-born rugby union player who represented Australia.

Webb, a forward, was born in Dunedin, New Zealand and attended Otago Boys' High School. Webb played for Otago in 1888 coming out of the Zingari-Richmond club. He moved to Sydney in 1894 and joined the Wallaroo club.  He was described as being a "powerfully built backrow forward".

In 1899 Webb was in the New South Wales team which faced the touring British Lions. Based on his performance he was then selected for the final two matches for Australia against the tourists.

References

Australian rugby union players
Australia international rugby union players
1868 births
1931 deaths
Rugby union players from Dunedin
Rugby union forwards